John Andree  may refer to:

John Andree (physician) (c. 1699–1785), British physician, father of the surgeon
John Andree (surgeon) ( 1790), English surgeon, son of the physician

See also
Andree (surname)